Baiardo is a surname. Notable people with the surname include:

 Davide Baiardo (1887–1977), Italian swimmer
 Giovanni Battista Baiardo (died 1657), Italian painter
 Mercurio Baiardo (fl. 1500s), Italian painter

See also
 Bajardo, a village in the Italian region Liguria, also spelled Baiardo
 Bayard (legend), a magic bay horse in the legends derived from the chansons de geste, known in the Italian versions as Baiardo
 Bayard (disambiguation)